The Africa Movie Academy Award for Best Actress in a Leading Role is an annual merit by the Africa Film Academy to reward the Best female actress in a leading role.

References

Lists of award winners
Best Actress Africa Movie Academy Award winners
Film awards for lead actress